Parent & Child Magazine was a magazine published by Scholastic. The award-winning magazine was founded in 1993 in Jefferson City, Missouri, as Scholastic's contribution to the parenting magazine category. Competitors included Parents and FamilyFun. Parent & Child highlighted the following editorial topics: activities and crafts, reading and education, children's development, health, and wellness, family recipes, and family time. The magazine also produced a kids website and a free mobile app,  KidQ. Jane Nussbaum was editor in chief since 2013. According to an announcement from Cision, Scholastic Parent & Child ceased publication, with its August/September 2015 issue being its last."

Editorial sections
 Busy Minds
 Happy+Healthy
 Me Time
 Easy Eats
 Together Time

Staff
 Editor-in-chief: Jane Isabel Nussbaum
 Art director: Jennie Utschig
 Integrated content director: Elizabeth Anne Shaw
 President, consumer and professional publishing: Hugh Roome
 Vice president, publisher: Jamie Engel

Notes

Defunct magazines published in the United States
Eight times annually magazines published in the United States
Lifestyle magazines published in the United States
Magazines established in 1993
Magazines disestablished in 2015
Magazines published in Missouri
Magazines published in New York City
Parenting magazines
Scholastic Corporation